Marisa Sistach (né Marysa Sistach Peret, born September 10, 1952) is a Mexican film director. Her films address themes of femininity and women's issues.

Early life  
Peret was born on September 10, 1952, in Mexico City, Distrito Federal, Mexico. She attended and graduated from el Centro de Capacitación Cinematográfica in Mexico City, a film school founded by Mexico's National Council for Culture and Arts. According to Elissa Rashkin, Sistach was among a movement in the late 1980s of innovative female directors in Mexican cinematic history, along with Maria Novaro, Busi Cortés, Guita Schyfter, and Dana Rotberg. This movement was described as being "coming to terms with the past (with the past in images, with the past in the history of the country), the acknowledgement of one’s own sensitivity (romanticism recovered in a feminist way), and the emergence of magic realism as denaturalization of women’s world, as a way of making representation visible."

Career  
Her first film was short live-action piece ¿Y si Platicamos de Agosto? in 1980, for which she won an Ariel (Mexican Academy Award). Other films she has directed include Perfume de violetas (2001), El cometa (1999), Anoche soñé contigo (1992), Los pasos de Ana (1990), La niña en la piedra (2006) and Los Crímenes de Mar del Norte (2017).

Legacy 
Her films are a social commentary on gender inequality, violence against women, socioeconomic class and adolescence. Screening Minors in Latin American Cinema described Sistach's directorial perspective on these issues, saying, "films such as Sistach's highlight the socioeconomic divide between adolescence and sexual exploration in those higher up versus lower down on the economic scale. Moreover, they illustrate the lack of agency and recourse to justice available to adolescents on the lower end of the economic scale - especially female adolescents who are twice marginalized by gender and economic status."

According to Rashkin, Sistach's Los pasos de Ana (1990), along with Busi Cortés' El secreto de Romeila (1988) were the two most popular feature films directed by Mexican women of their time. Her films were described by critics as innovative as they opened doors and created opportunities for women in cinema and film production. Perfume de Violeta was awarded three Ariels, won over twenty prizes on the international film festival sphere, and was Mexico's official choice for the Academy Awards.

Rashkin stated that the works created a genre of "women's cinema" that took women characters beyond objectification. She further remarked that Sistach's work allowed for more autonomy for women in film.

Sistach stated that she "situated her filmmaking in relation to Golden Age melodramas by saying that her films responded to classical films' reduction of women to the roles of 'good mother' or 'prostitute' [...] she created 'a kind of woman who exists in the Mexican reality, but who has not been represented on the screen before.'" She aimed to reshape the portrayal of women in Mexican cinema, saying,"I believe that women have to invent, in our field of work, a new language that will be nourished by the common experiences of our individual histories. This woman’s word should be inscribed in our culture. To destroy the false mirror of woman that is, in general, the cinema. . . . It means reappropriating our image and in doing so, seeking our identity."

Critics have stated that Sistach's films are unique in that they portray controversial themes and messages that address the powerlessness of minority groups. In "Screening Minors in Latin American Cinema", author Traci Roberts-Camps describes the impact of Sistach's films, explaining, "Sistach portrays protagonists who have less agency because they are young, female, and working class— these factors affect their ability to 'resist, negotiate and transform' external forces of power. These three factors— age, gender, and socioeconomic class— combine in such a way that the young women have little recourse to justice after the violence they experience. In other words, they are powerless to affect change in the institutional structures that overlook or perpetuate this violence."Sistach's perspective is to comment on societal constructs in Mexico as well as to present a feminist demand for change in patriarchal aspects of this society. Critic Diego de Pozo's commentary on Sistach's Perfume de violetas celebrates both of these purposes, stating,"Perfume de violetas shows how the city and its economy interact, which in turn has an effect on individuals as manifested in family and social interaction and expectancies and including the constructions of gender. All of these elements are intensified in the broad lower-class. Sistach's film becomes a representation of how the urban setting, with its limited access and drive to attain capital, provokes sexual violence against females and transforms these citizens into agents of violence to secure survival [...] Perfume de violetas denounces the governmental and societal ignorance which affects females in Mexico. The protagonist interacts with a dominant culture and an urban space that provoke sexual violence against the female subject. The home and school spheres create the construction of gender which result in violence when females enter the public space."

Filmography

References

External links
 

1952 births
Mexican directors
Living people